Jabłoń-Markowięta  is a village in the administrative district of Gmina Nowe Piekuty, within Wysokie Mazowieckie County, Podlaskie Voivodeship, in north-eastern Poland.

References

Villages in Wysokie Mazowieckie County